The NE postcode area, also known as the Newcastle upon Tyne postcode area, is a group of 61 postcode districts in north-east England covering 34 post towns. These cover most of Tyne and Wear (including Newcastle upon Tyne, Gateshead, North Shields, South Shields, Wallsend, Whitley Bay, Hebburn, Jarrow, Washington, Blaydon-on-Tyne, East Boldon, Boldon Colliery, Rowlands Gill and Ryton) and Northumberland (including Blyth, Morpeth, Hexham, Alnwick, Cramlington, Bedlington, Ashington, Prudhoe, Bamburgh, Riding Mill, Choppington, Corbridge, Seahouses, Newbiggin-by-the-Sea, Stocksfield, Haltwhistle, Wylam, Chathill, Belford and Wooler), plus a very small part of northern County Durham. The NH postcode area is one of six with a population above 1 million.



History
The original NE postal district was created as part of the London postal district in 1858, covering north east London. It was abolished, along with the S postal district covering south London, in 1866..

Coverage
The approximate coverage of the postcode districts:

! NE1
| NEWCASTLE UPON TYNE
| City Centre, Newcastle Quayside 
| City of Newcastle upon Tyne
|-
! NE2
| NEWCASTLE UPON TYNE
| City Centre, Jesmond, Sandyford, Spital Tongues, Shieldfield
| City of Newcastle upon Tyne
|-
! NE3
| NEWCASTLE UPON TYNE
| Gosforth, Fawdon, Kingston Park, Kenton, Great Park
| City of Newcastle upon Tyne
|-
! NE4
| NEWCASTLE UPON TYNE
| City Centre, Arthurs Hill, Elswick, Wingrove, Benwell, Fenham
| City of Newcastle upon Tyne
|-
! NE5
| NEWCASTLE UPON TYNE
| Blakelaw, Cowgate, Denton, Westerhope
| City of Newcastle upon Tyne
|-
! NE6
| NEWCASTLE UPON TYNE
| Heaton, Byker, Walker, Walkergate
| City of Newcastle upon Tyne
|-
! NE7
| NEWCASTLE UPON TYNE
| Heaton, Gosforth, Benton
| City of Newcastle upon Tyne
|-
! NE8
| GATESHEAD
| Gateshead Quayside, Gateshead Town, Bensham
| Metropolitan Borough of Gateshead
|-
! NE9
| GATESHEAD
| Low Fell, Springwell,Wreckenton,Beacon lough
| Metropolitan Borough of Gateshead, City of Sunderland
|-
! NE10
| GATESHEAD
| Felling, Whitehills Estate, Leam Lane, Pelaw, Bill Quay
| Metropolitan Borough of Gateshead 
|-
! NE11
| GATESHEAD
| Dunston, Kibblesworth, Team Valley, MetroCentre
| Metropolitan Borough of Gateshead
|-
! NE12
| NEWCASTLE UPON TYNE
| Longbenton, Killingworth, Benton
| City of Newcastle upon Tyne, Metropolitan Borough of North Tyneside
|-
! NE13
| NEWCASTLE UPON TYNE
| Newcastle International Airport, Wideopen, Great Park, Dinnington, Woolsington, Hazlerigg
| City of Newcastle upon Tyne
|-
! NE15
| NEWCASTLE UPON TYNE
| Lemington, Throckley, Newburn, Fenham, Benwell, Scotswood
| City of Newcastle upon Tyne
|-
! NE16
| NEWCASTLE UPON TYNE
| Whickham, Sunniside, Burnopfield
| City of Newcastle upon Tyne, Metropolitan Borough of Gateshead, County Durham
|-
! NE17
| NEWCASTLE UPON TYNE
| Chopwell, Western Chopwell Wood
| Metropolitan Borough of Gateshead
|-
! NE18
| NEWCASTLE UPON TYNE
| Stamfordham, Dalton
| Northumberland
|-
! NE19
| NEWCASTLE UPON TYNE
| Byrness, Otterburn
| Northumberland
|-
! NE20
| NEWCASTLE UPON TYNE
| Ponteland
| Northumberland
|-
! NE21
| BLAYDON-ON-TYNE
| Blaydon, Winlaton
| Metropolitan Borough of Gateshead
|-
! NE22
| BEDLINGTON
| Bedlington, Hartford Bridge
| Northumberland
|-
! NE23
| CRAMLINGTON
| Cramlington, Seghill
| Northumberland
|-
! NE24
| BLYTH
| Blyth, Newsham, Cowpen, Cambois
| Northumberland
|-
! NE25
| WHITLEY BAY
| Monkseaton, Earsdon, New Hartley, Holywell, Seaton Delaval
| Metropolitan Borough of North Tyneside, Northumberland 
|-
! NE26
| WHITLEY BAY
| Whitley Bay, Seaton Sluice
| Metropolitan Borough of North Tyneside, Northumberland
|-
! NE27
| NEWCASTLE UPON TYNE
| Shiremoor, West Allotment, Backworth, Holystone, Murton Village
| Metropolitan Borough of North Tyneside
|-
! NE28
| NEWCASTLE UPON TYNE; WALLSEND
| Walker, Battle Hill, Willington, Wallsend, North Tyne Tunnel
| City of Newcastle upon Tyne, Metropolitan Borough of North Tyneside
|-
! NE29
| NORTH SHIELDS
| North Shields, Royal Quays, Billy Mill, New York
| North Tyneside
|-
! NE30
| NORTH SHIELDS
| Marden, Tynemouth, Cullercoats
| Metropolitan Borough of North Tyneside
|-
! NE31
| HEBBURN
| Hebburn
| Metropolitan Borough of South Tyneside 
|-
! NE32
| JARROW
| Jarrow, Fellgate, South Tyne Tunnel
| Metropolitan Borough of South Tyneside
|-
! NE33
| SOUTH SHIELDS
| Town Centre, Deans, High Shields
| Metropolitan Borough of South Tyneside
|-
! NE34
| SOUTH SHIELDS
| Harton, Horsley Hill, Marsden, Simonside, Brockley Whins
| Metropolitan Borough of South Tyneside
|-
! NE35
| BOLDON COLLIERY
| Boldon Colliery
| Metropolitan Borough of South Tyneside
|-
! NE36
| EAST BOLDON
| East Boldon, West Boldon
| Metropolitan Borough of South Tyneside
|-
! NE37
| WASHINGTON
| Usworth, Sulgrave, Albany
| City of Sunderland
|-
! NE38
| WASHINGTON
| Town Centre, Oxclose, Fatfield, Harraton
| City of Sunderland
|-
! NE39
| ROWLANDS GILL
| Rowlands Gill, High Spen, Hamsterley Mill, Eastern Chopwell Wood
| Metropolitan Borough of Gateshead, County Durham
|-
! NE40
| RYTON
| Ryton, Crawcrook, Greenside
| Metropolitan Borough of Gateshead
|-
! NE41
| WYLAM
| Wylam
| Metropolitan Borough of Gateshead, Northumberland
|-
! NE42
| PRUDHOE
| Prudhoe
| Northumberland
|-
! NE43
| STOCKSFIELD
| Stocksfield
| Northumberland
|-
! NE44
| RIDING MILL
| Riding Mill, Broomhaugh
| Northumberland
|-
! NE45
| CORBRIDGE
| Corbridge
| Northumberland
|-
! NE46
| HEXHAM
| Hexham
| Northumberland
|-
! NE47
| HEXHAM
| Acomb, Hexhamshire
| Northumberland
|-
! NE48
| HEXHAM
| Falstone, Kielder
| Northumberland
|-
! NE49
| HALTWHISTLE
| Haltwhistle
| Northumberland
|-
! NE61
| MORPETH
| Morpeth, Tranwell, Clifton, Hepscott, Mitford
| Northumberland
|-
! NE62
| CHOPPINGTON
| Scotland Gate, Guidepost, Stakeford, West Sleekburn, Bomarsund
| Northumberland
|-
! NE63
| ASHINGTON
| Ashington
| Northumberland
|-
! NE64
| NEWBIGGIN-BY-THE-SEA
| Newbiggin-by-the-Sea
| Northumberland
|-
! NE65
| MORPETH
| River Coquet
| Northumberland
|-
! NE66
| ALNWICK
| Alnwick, Shilbottle
| Northumberland
|-
! NE67
| CHATHILL
| Chathill, Beadnell
| Northumberland
|-
! NE68
| SEAHOUSES
| Seahouses
| Northumberland
|-
! NE69
| BAMBURGH
| Bamburgh
| Northumberland
|-
! NE70
| BELFORD
| Belford
| Northumberland
|-
! NE71
| WOOLER
| Wooler
| Northumberland
|-
! style="background:#FFFFFF;"|NE82
| style="background:#FFFFFF;"|NEWCASTLE UPON TYNE
| style="background:#FFFFFF;"|BT Group
| style="background:#FFFFFF;"|non-geographic
|-
! style="background:#FFFFFF;"|NE83
| style="background:#FFFFFF;"|NEWCASTLE UPON TYNE
| style="background:#FFFFFF;"|BT Group
| style="background:#FFFFFF;"|non-geographic
|-
! style="background:#FFFFFF;"|NE85
| style="background:#FFFFFF;"|NEWCASTLE UPON TYNE
| style="background:#FFFFFF;"|Spark Response Ltd
| style="background:#FFFFFF;"|non-geographic
|-
! style="background:#FFFFFF;"|NE88
| style="background:#FFFFFF;"|NEWCASTLE UPON TYNE
| style="background:#FFFFFF;"|HM Revenue and Customs (Child Benefit Centre)
| style="background:#FFFFFF;"|non-geographic
|-
! style="background:#FFFFFF;"|NE92
| style="background:#FFFFFF;"|GATESHEAD
| style="background:#FFFFFF;"|Department for Work and Pensions (Earlsway)
| style="background:#FFFFFF;"|non-geographic
|-
! style="background:#FFFFFF;"|NE98
| style="background:#FFFFFF;"|NEWCASTLE UPON TYNE
| style="background:#FFFFFF;"|Department for Work and Pensions (Central Office)
| style="background:#FFFFFF;"|non-geographic
|-
! style="background:#FFFFFF;"|NE99
| style="background:#FFFFFF;"|NEWCASTLE UPON TYNE
| style="background:#FFFFFF;"|Locked boxes (Head Post Office)
| style="background:#FFFFFF;"|non-geographic
|}

Map

See also
Postcode Address File
List of postcode areas in the United Kingdom

References

External links
Royal Mail's Postcode Address File
A quick introduction to Royal Mail's Postcode Address File (PAF)

Newcastle upon Tyne
Northumberland
Postcode areas covering North East England